A double-sided painting is a canvas which has a painting on either side. Historically, artists would often paint on both sides out of need of material. The subject matter of the two paintings was sometimes, although not normally, related.

Painting techniques